Oakland Farm is a historic farmhouse at the northern end of Oakland Street in Camden, Arkansas.  The -story cypress house was built in 1886, and stands on one of the largest and most prominent estates in Camden.  The house was built by William Frank Tate, descendant of Ouachita County's first English settler, John Tate, and remains in the Tate family.  It has a T shape, with a main block and a series of additions which give it that shape.  A veranda supported by Doric columns spans the width of the main facade.

The house, and a small parcel of land surrounding it, was listed on the National Register of Historic Places in 1978.  The larger farm property also includes the listed Tate's Barn.

See also
National Register of Historic Places listings in Ouachita County, Arkansas

References

Houses on the National Register of Historic Places in Arkansas
Houses completed in 1886
Houses in Ouachita County, Arkansas
Buildings and structures in Camden, Arkansas
National Register of Historic Places in Ouachita County, Arkansas
1886 establishments in Arkansas
Farms on the National Register of Historic Places in Arkansas